La casa de al lado (The House Next Door) is an American Spanish-language black comedy telenovela produced by the United States-based television network Telemundo. This mystery is a remake of the Chilean telenovela La familia de al lado produced by TVN in 2010-2011 and is being adapted by the author of the original, José Ignacio Valenzuela making a story longer with many differences from the original.

Filming began in April 2011 and was completed in December 2011. From May 31, 2011, to January 23, 2012, Telemundo aired the serial on weeknights at 9pm/8c during the 2011–2012 season The version broadcast by Telemundo at 10pm contained an above average level of violence. As with most of its other telenovelas, the network  broadcasts English subtitles as closed captions on CC3. In Pakistan, the show was broadcast on Urdu 1 retitled Ek Dhund Si Chayi Hai.

Plot 
This tale is a black comedy with an absurd body-count.  It is a circus where people go to the hospital and to jail.  The Condes, a wealthy and influential family, appear to have it all: money, power, and a close, beautiful family. They were recently rocked by a tragedy when Adolfo (David Chocarro), husband of the eldest daughter Ignacia Conde (Catherine Siachoque) apparently died by falling out a window in the family mansion. The other 2 siblings of Ignacia  are Carola Conde (Ximena Duque) and Emilio Conde (Gabriel Valenzuela). Meanwhile, apparently Adolfo's twin, Leonardo, continues to live in the mansion, confined to a wheel chair. When Gonzalo Ibañez (Gabriel Porras) marries Ignacia 6 months later, he is compelled to unravel the mystery of what happened to Adolfo. Mysterious events begin to envelop the Conde family suggesting that Adolfo is alive and well.

Next door live Pilar Arismendi (Maritza Rodríguez) and her husband, Javier Ruiz (Miguel Varoni), with their two children. Behind the gloss of success and family felicity lurks a dark reality and secrets that threaten to devastate both the Ruiz and Conde families. Javier is a highly regarded and influential attorney, who, for years, is employed by the Condes. Javier's privileged position becomes threatened by Gonzalo, who is appointed Javier's business associate by his powerful father-in-law, Renato Conde (Daniel Lugo). Javier will do anything to protect to what he believes he is entitled. Romantic intrigue develops between the neighbors and further confounds the mysteries, the tension, the dangers, and the suspense that loom large in the novela. Pilar has a sister called Rebeca Arismendi (Karla Monroig).

It is revealed that Ignacia, Carola, and Emilio are not biological siblings, as their parents could not have children, and so they were adopted. Emilio marries Hilda (Sofia Lama) but they divorce after she gives birth to a child with problems and she soon starts to have problems herself. Emilio starts working as gigolo.
 
Gonzalo/Inaki Mora, Adolfo/Ismael Mora and Leonardo/Ivan Mora turn out to be brothers, being Mabel and Igor's sons. They want to take revenge on the Condes' so they had thrown Ivan out of the window and Adolfo took his place. They murdered several persons who found out their true agenda. The first person to whom is revealed that Gonzalo is a criminal is Matias (Jorge Luis Pila), Rebeca's fiancée. Gonzalo shoots him, Adolfo being present.

Pilar falls in love with Gonzalo and divorces Javier. Gonzalo kidnaps Rebeca after she had found out that Adolfo/Ismael and him are murderers. Adolfo/Ismael discovers her, she manages to escape but he follows her by car and causes her an accident. She remains paralyzed, mute.

Pilar's twin sister, Raquel Arismendi (Maritza Rodríguez) also wants to get revenge and pour out her wrath on the two families, Ruiz and Conde. She wants to destroy Pilar because she had a better life. Cecilia gave her for adoption because she could not raise both of them. Raquel had a bad life, was abused by her stepfather, killed him, ended up in prison. She is the author of "La Casa de al Lado" and "Condenados"; in "Condenados" she announces the next murders. She poisons Sebastian. She shoots Ignacia and kills her. She helped Renato Conde to commit suicide. She has a brief fling with Ismael.

In the series finale, Raquel is accidentally stabbed by Pilar. Ismael is burned to death by Carola. Gonzalo is arrested.  But a new family moves in to be another Casa de al Lado with a beautiful wife. The villain Javier does the comical hot diggity reaction to her, and we surmise he will be doing adultery with her soon. A villain triumphs at the end.

Cast

Main 

 Maritza Rodríguez as Pilar Arismendi / Raquel Arismendi, protagonist/her twin sister, main female villain character, writer of the House in the neighbors, killed 5 persons Raquel- Accidentally stabbed by Pilar
 Gabriel Porras as Gonzalo Ibáñez / Iñaki Mora Vergara / Roberto Acosta, protagonist and main male villain character, wants to revenge on the Conde family, killed many persons, Ends up in jail
 Miguel Varoni as Javier Ruiz, villain, husband of Pilar
 Catherine Siachoque as Ignacia Conde villain, wife of Gonzalo Shot by Raquel
 David Chocarro as Adolfo Acosta / Ismael Mora  / Leonardo Acosta / Iván Mora. Secondary male villain character, killed many persons, Burned alive by Carola
 Daniel Lugo as Renato Conde Manipulated by Raquel into committing suicide
 Felicia Mercado as Eva Spencer
 Karla Monroig as Rebeca Arismendi
 Jorge Luis Pila as Matías Santa María
 Orlando Fundichely as Sebastián Andrade Poisoned by Raquel
 Angélica María as Cecilia Arismendi

Also starring 

 Henry Zakka as Igor Mora
 Ximena Duque as Carola Conde
 Sofía Lama as Hilda González 
 Rosalinda Rodríguez as Karen Ortega
 Gabriel Valenzuela as Emilio Conde
 Héctor Fuentes as Nibaldo González
 Vivián Ruiz as Yolanda Sánchez
 Alexandra Pomales as Andrea Ruiz
 Andrés Cotrino as Diego Ruiz

Guest 
 Martha Pabón as Mabel Mora
 Miguel Augusto Rodríguez as Omar Blanco
 Ariel Texido as Danilo Salas

Awards 
La Casa de al Lado has been nominated for Novela of the Year, Favorite Lead Actress (Catherine Siachoque) and Actor (Gabriel Porras), The Best Bad Boy and Girl, Best Supporting Actress, The Perfect Couple, The Best Kiss, Great Young Actor, and Best Novela Soundtrack. It won Favorite Lead Actress (Maritza Rodríguez) and Best Supporting Actor.

References

External links 
 Official La Casa de al Lado Website (Spanish)
 La Casa de al Lado Mobile Site (Spanish)
 La Casa de al Lado iPhone and iPad Novelas App with La Casa de Al Lado (Spanish)
 Seriesnow (English)
 Club de Noveleras (Spanish)

2011 telenovelas
2011 American television series debuts
2012 American television series endings
Psychological thriller television series
Serial killers in television
American television series based on telenovelas
Spanish-language American telenovelas
Fiction about murder
Murder in television
Telemundo telenovelas
American television series based on Chilean television series